Fingerlings 2 is the second album in a series of live releases by Andrew Bird. Self-released in 2004, it features appearances by My Morning Jacket and Nora O'Connor as well as five live renditions of tracks featured on Bird's 2005 release The Mysterious Production of Eggs.

Track listing

References

https://web.archive.org/web/20070705193435/http://www.andrewbird.net/fingerlings2.htm (November 30, 2007)

Andrew Bird albums
2004 live albums